Preston is a census-designated place in White Pine County, Nevada, United States. Preston was established by Mormon settlers in 1876, and named after William B. Preston, the fourth Presiding Bishop of the Church of Jesus Christ of Latter-day Saints between 1884 and 1907. The community's economy is based on agriculture and ranching. In the 2010 census it had a population of 78.

Demographics

References

Census-designated places in Nevada
Census-designated places in White Pine County, Nevada
Great Basin National Heritage Area